This article is about the particular significance of the year 1796 to Wales and its people.

Incumbents
Lord Lieutenant of Anglesey - Henry Paget 
Lord Lieutenant of Brecknockshire and Monmouthshire – Henry Somerset, 5th Duke of Beaufort
Lord Lieutenant of Caernarvonshire - Thomas Bulkeley, 7th Viscount Bulkeley
Lord Lieutenant of Cardiganshire – Wilmot Vaughan, 1st Earl of Lisburne
Lord Lieutenant of Carmarthenshire – John Vaughan  
Lord Lieutenant of Denbighshire – Sir Watkin Williams-Wynn, 5th Baronet (from 4 April)  
Lord Lieutenant of Flintshire – Sir Roger Mostyn, 5th Baronet (until 26 July); Lloyd Kenyon, 1st Baron Kenyon (from 9 September)
Lord Lieutenant of Glamorgan – John Stuart, 1st Marquess of Bute 
Lord Lieutenant of Merionethshire - Sir Watkin Williams-Wynn, 5th Baronet
Lord Lieutenant of Montgomeryshire – George Herbert, 2nd Earl of Powis
Lord Lieutenant of Pembrokeshire – Richard Philipps, 1st Baron Milford
Lord Lieutenant of Radnorshire – Thomas Harley

Bishop of Bangor – John Warren
Bishop of Llandaff – Richard Watson
Bishop of St Asaph – Lewis Bagot
Bishop of St Davids – William Stuart

Events
27 February - John Stuart is created Marquess of Bute.
June - At the British general election, Richard Pennant, 1st Baron Penrhyn, backed by Bishop John Warren, challenges sitting MP Sir Robert Williams, the sitting member for Caernarvonshire; Sir Robert is easily re-elected.
John Wilkinson blows in blast furnace No. 1 on the site that becomes Brymbo Steelworks.

Arts and literature

New books
Charles Heath - The Excursion Down the Wye
Thomas Pennant - Whiteford and Holywell
Uvedale Price - An Essay on the Picturesque
Anna Seward - Llangollen Vale and Other Poems
David Williams - The History of Monmouthshire

Births
7 January - Princess Charlotte Augusta of Wales, only child of the Prince and Princess of Wales (died 1817)
8 January - Eliza Constantia Campbell, author (died 1864)
1 March - John Jones, Talysarn, preacher (died 1857)
30 September - John Mytton, sportsman (died 1834)
December - David Owen (Brutus), writer (died 1866)

Deaths
February - John Jones, organist, 70?
26 July - Sir Roger Mostyn, 5th Baronet, landowner and politician, 61
8 August - Peter Williams, Methodist writer, 63
date unknown - Ioan Siencyn, poet

References

1796 by country
1796 in Great Britain